Jack Capstick (1 January 1919 – 24 December 1993) was a New Zealand cricketer. He played in three first-class matches for Wellington in 1946/47.

See also
 List of Wellington representative cricketers

References

External links
 

1919 births
1993 deaths
New Zealand cricketers
Wellington cricketers
Cricketers from Dunedin